Royal Scot may refer to:
 Garde Écossaise, a regiment of the French army
 Royal Scots, a regiment of the British Army
 Royal Scots (Jacobite), a regiment of Scottish exiles in French service, in existence from 1744 to 1762
 Royal Scot (train), a British named express passenger train which first ran in 1862
 LMS Royal Scot Class, a class of express passenger locomotive introduced in 1927
 LMS Royal Scot Class 6100 Royal Scot, a preserved British steam locomotive of the above class
 a Solenostemon scutellarioides cultivar